Os Trapalhões e o Rei do Futebol (English: The Tramps and the King of Football) is a Brazilian comedy film released in 1986, directed by Carlos Manga with the humoristic group Os Trapalhões and the former player Pelé. It was watched by about 3.6 million people in 1986.

Cast
Renato Aragão .... Cardeal
Pelé .... Nascimento
Dedé Santana .... Elvis
Mussum .... Fumê
Zacarias .... Tremoço
Luiza Brunet .... Aninha
José Lewgoy .... Dr. Velhaccio
Milton Moraes .... Dr. Barros Barreto
Maurício do Valle .... Edésio
Marcelo Ibrahim .... Sansão
Older Cazarré .... Seu Mané

References

External links

1986 films
1986 comedy films
1980s sports comedy films
Brazilian association football films
Brazilian sports comedy films
Pelé